Saleem Nazim (born 1 January 1955) is a former field hockey player from Pakistan Men's National Hockey Team. He won the bronze medal in 1976 Summer Olympics in Montreal, Quebec, Canada.

References

External links
 

Living people
Pakistani male field hockey players
Olympic field hockey players of Pakistan
Olympic bronze medalists for Pakistan
Olympic medalists in field hockey
Medalists at the 1976 Summer Olympics
Field hockey players at the 1976 Summer Olympics
Asian Games medalists in field hockey
Field hockey players at the 1974 Asian Games
Asian Games gold medalists for Pakistan
Medalists at the 1974 Asian Games
1955 births
20th-century Pakistani people